The Dagebüll–Oland–Langeneß island railway is a  gauge Feldbahn in North Frisia that connects Dagebüll to the Halligen (low-lying islands) of Oland and Langeneß.

Gallery

References

Literature

External links 
 Halligbahn Oland–Langeneß
 Segellore
 Photo: Segel-Lore zur Postlieferung startet zu den Halligen Oland und Langeneß
 WDR: „Planet Wissen“ zu Halligen und Segelloren
 
  YouTube

Railway lines in Schleswig-Holstein
900 mm gauge railways in Germany